

Arthur Kullmer (17 August 1896 – 28 March 1953) was a German general during World War II who commanded several divisions. He was a recipient of the  Knight's Cross of the Iron Cross with Oak Leaves of Nazi Germany. Kullmer died on 28 March 1953 in Soviet captivity.

Awards and decorations
 Iron Cross (1914) 2nd Class (29 August 1916) & 1st Class (8 October 1918)
 Clasp to the Iron Cross (1939) 2nd Class (26 May 1940) & 1st Class (12 July 1940)
 German Cross in Gold on 14 January 1942 as Oberstleutnant in Infanterie-Regiment 331
 Knight's Cross of the Iron Cross with Oak Leaves
 Knight's Cross on 27 October 1943 as Generalleutnant and commander of 296. Infanterie-Division
 Oak Leaves on 28 February 1945 as Generalleutnant and commander of 558. Volksgrenadier-Division

References

Citations

Bibliography

 
 
 

1896 births
1953 deaths
People from Bad Dürkheim (district)
Military personnel from Rhineland-Palatinate
Generals of Infantry (Wehrmacht)
German Army personnel of World War I
Reichswehr personnel
Recipients of the Gold German Cross
Recipients of the Knight's Cross of the Iron Cross with Oak Leaves
German prisoners of war in World War II held by the Soviet Union
German people who died in Soviet detention
German Army generals of World War II